Some Time Never: A Fable for Supermen is a 1948 book by Roald Dahl, his first adult novel. Dahl began writing it after editor Maxwell Perkins expressed an interest in publishing a novel length book if Dahl were to write it. The book was met with predominantly poor reception and was considered to be a failure, although it is historically noteworthy as the first novel about nuclear war to be published in the United States after the atomic bombings of Hiroshima and Nagasaki. The story is a darker take on the same premise as Dahl's first children's novel, The Gremlins.

Synopsis
In 1943, RAF pilot Peternip discovers a Gremlin or miniature being, drilling holes on the wing of his aircraft,  so he sets off with his squadron to unearth the story behind them. Many years ago gremlins were the rulers of the world, but they were forced underground by the spread of humanity and have spent the time since then planning their revenge. They briefly emerge during the Battle of Britain, but the experience makes them decide that humankind would destroy themselves without their intervention. The gremlins wait until the time is right - after World War III and World War IV decimate the earth, they emerge and take over the world. The story ends with the gremlins, unable to exist in a world without humans, disappearing too; finally, only the worm remains.

Reception
Sometime Never was met with mostly negative reviews, but did receive some praise from the Glasgow Herald and The Saturday Review.

Editions
The work was first published by Scribner's in the United States in 1948 under the title Some Time Never: A Fable for Supermen. The UK edition, entitled simply Sometime Never, was published by Collins in 1949. The final chapter of the UK version was revised slightly to elaborate on the ultimate disappearance of the Gremlins.

, the work has never been reprinted in English, although a Dutch translation (Ooit en te nimmer) has run through several editions.

References

Citations

Bibliography

 Treglown, Jeremy. Roald Dahl: A Biography. New York: Harvest/Harcourt Brace, 1995, first edition 1994. .
 Tuck, Donald H. The Encyclopedia of Science Fiction and Fantasy. Chicago: Advent, 1974. .

External links
 Roald Dahl (Official Website)

1948 British novels
Novels by Roald Dahl
Novels about nuclear war and weapons
Gremlins
Charles Scribner's Sons books